Disterna concinna is a species of beetle in the family Cerambycidae. It was described by Thomas Blackburn in 1901. It is known from Australia.

References

Zygocerini
Beetles described in 1901